Malheur Brewery (Brouwerij Malheur) is a brewery in Buggenhout, Belgium, formerly named De Landtsheer. It is known for its Malheur brew.

Description
The Malheur is a unique pale ale that is as close to a champagne as a beer can get. The yeast used is a similar to champagne yeast, which is what gives the beer the mouth feel, carbonation, and color of a "champagne", and more appealing than a Freixenet Brut. The ABV is lower than Freixenet. Aromas of huge lemon, lemon zest, orange peel, apricot, herbal, floral, grass, earth, pepper, honey, and spicy yeast esters. Taste is of grain, grape juice, and spices with an alcohol kick. It is often poured into a champagne glass rather than a beer mug, and served at room temperature.

References

External links

 
 Introducing Brouwerij De Landtsheer
 YouTube

Breweries of Flanders
Companies based in East Flanders
Buggenhout